Heterocypsela is a genus of flowering plants in the daisy family.

Species
There is only one known species, Heterocypsela andersonii, native to the State of Minas Gerais in Brazil.

References

Endemic flora of Brazil
Monotypic Asteraceae genera
Vernonieae